"Staying Alive" is a song by American record producer DJ Khaled featuring Canadian rapper Drake and American rapper Lil Baby, released on August 5, 2022 as the lead single from the former's thirteenth studio album God Did (2022). The song contains an interpolation of the similarly named "Stayin' Alive" by the Bee Gees.

Composition
The song begins with the chorus, in which Drake sings in Auto-Tuned vocals and interpolates the chorus of "Stayin' Alive" by The Bee Gees: "Try me a hundred times / Wanted me to lie, wanted me to cry, wanted me to die / Ah, ah, ah, I'm stayin' alive, I'm stayin' alive, I'm stayin' alive, I'm stayin' alive". Drake performs the first verse, while Lil Baby performs the second verse. The song features "sharp hi-hats" in the production and has been considered a midtempo track.

Music video
A music video directed by RT! was released alongside the single. The video was shot at York University. The visual takes place in the fictional Khaled Khaled Hospital, and stars DJ Khaled as head of general surgery, Lil Baby as head of cardiothoracic surgery, and Drake as head of neuro surgery. Wearing blue scrubs and a stethoscope, Drake smokes hookah and takes shots with the staff, and also mindlessly signs charts and waves off nurses. Meanwhile, Lil Baby smokes a blunt while performing surgery, and then wears a white doctor's coat while partying in a club within the hospital. Later, the three artists meet at the hospital's parking lot, surrounded by ambulances.

Charts

Weekly charts

Year-end charts

Certifications

References

2022 singles
2022 songs
DJ Khaled songs
Drake (musician) songs
Lil Baby songs
Songs written by DJ Khaled
Songs written by Drake (musician)
Songs written by Lil Baby
Songs written by Barry Gibb
Songs written by Maurice Gibb
Songs written by Robin Gibb
Epic Records singles